The Torneo de Promoción y Reserva is a football tournament in Peru. There are currently 16 clubs in the league. Each team will have in staff to twelve 21-year-old players, three of 19 and three experienced; whenever they be recorded in the club. The team champion in this tournament will offer two points and the runner-up a point of bonus to the respective regular team in the 2012 Torneo Descentralizado.

On February 20, 2012, the club Universidad San Martín for extra-sporting issues, announced his definitive retirement from professional football and the local tournament. On March 14, 2012, the club Universidad San Martín, returned to the local tournament and professional football.

Teams

League table

Results

Title playoffs

Top goalscorers
16 goals
 José Lolandes (Sport Huancayo)

References

External links
 Así se jugará el campeonato peruano
 Blog del Torneo de Promoción y Reservas

Res
2012